Sayers may refer to:

Sayers (bakery), an independent retail baker in the north-west of England
Sayers, Texas, an unincorporated town in eastern Bexar County, Texas, United States
Sayers (surname)
Sayers 40, Inc., a technology firm founded by Gale Sayers
Sayers, Allport & Potter, a pharmaceutical firm in Sydney, Australia